
This is a list of the 26 players who earned their 2013 PGA Tour card through Q School in 2012. 2012 was the final year Q School would grant direct access to the PGA Tour. Future Q Schools will only grant access to the second-tier Web.com Tour. Brad Fritsch previously earned his 2013 PGA Tour card through his finish on the 2012 Web.com Tour money list; he did not count against the 25, but did improve his status.

Players in yellow were 2013 PGA Tour rookies.
†: First-time PGA Tour member in 2013, but ineligible for rookie status due to having played eight or more Tour events in a previous season

2013 Results

*PGA Tour rookie in 2013
†First-time PGA Tour member in 2013, but ineligible for rookie status due to having played eight or more Tour events in a previous season
T = Tied
 Retained his PGA Tour card for 2014: won or finished in the top 125 of the money list or FedEx Cup points list.
 Retained PGA Tour conditional status and qualified for the Web.com Tour Finals: finished between 126–150 on FedEx Cup list and qualified for Web.com Tour Finals.
 Failed to retain his PGA Tour card for 2014 but qualified for the Web.com Tour Finals: finished between 150–200 on FedEx Cup list.
 Failed to retain his PGA Tour card for 2014 and to qualify for the Web.com Tour Finals: finished outside the top 200 on FedEx Cup list.

Brad Fritsch and Bobby Gates regained their cards for 2014 through the Web.com Tour Finals.

Winners on the PGA Tour in 2013

Runners-up on the PGA Tour in 2013

See also
2012 Web.com Tour graduates

References

PGA Tour Qualifying School
PGA Tour Qualifying School Graduates
PGA Tour Qualifying School Graduates